General Henry Sinclair Horne, 1st Baron Horne,  (19 February 1861 – 14 August 1929) was a military officer in the British Army, most notable for his generalship during the First World War. He was the only British artillery officer to command an army in the war.

Background and education
Horne was born on 19 February 1861 in the parish of Wick in Caithness, Scotland, the third son of Major James Horne and Constance Mary Shewell. He was first educated at Harrow, receiving an artillery commission from the Royal Military Academy, Woolwich in May 1880, when he was appointed a lieutenant in the Royal Field Artillery. Promotion to captain followed on 17 August 1888, and to major on 23 February 1898.

Early military career
From 1899 to 1902 Horne fought with the cavalry in the Second Boer War in South Africa under Sir John French. He received the brevet promotion to lieutenant colonel on 29 November 1900, and in the latter stages of the war served as a remount officer and was mentioned in despatches. Following the end of hostilities in June 1902 he returned to England, leaving Cape Town in the SS Norman which arrived in Southampton in late August that year. In 1905 he received the substantive promotion to lieutenant colonel and served with the Royal Horse Artillery under Douglas Haig. His military career was unremarkable until 1912 when he was promoted to brigadier and appointed Inspector of Artillery.

First World War
War broke out two years later and Horne was appointed to command a force of artillery under Lieutenant-General Douglas Haig, who commanded I Corps. At the Battle of Mons, Horne distinguished himself with a rearguard action that allowed Haig's I Corps to retreat almost effortlessly; admittedly the German Army made few attacks toward Haig's forces, as they were occupied by Sir Horace Smith-Dorrien's costly defensive action.

Horne fought with distinction in the British Expeditionary Force's (BEF) actions throughout 1914; in October of that year, he was promoted to Major-General and created a Companion of the Order of the Bath. A few months later, he was given command of the 2nd Division. In May 1915, Horne's division participated in the first British night attack of the war, distinguishing itself at the Battle of Festubert; the attack faltered, partly because the artillery ran out of ammunition. The media launched vicious attacks on the Secretary of State for War, Lord Kitchener; the blame was eventually laid on Field Marshal French who was forced to resign at the year's end. Significantly, the artillery were reorganised after this fiasco at Horne's suggestion.

Middle East
In November 1915, Horne accompanied Lord Kitchener to the Dardanelles, where they organised and executed the evacuation of Gallipoli. For several months, Horne was placed in charge of the Suez Canal defences (and given command of the XV Corps).

Western Front

March 1916 saw him return to the Western Front. He was allotted to the Fourth Army, which was preparing for an attack in the Somme area. In the pre-battle plans, Horne advocated and became an architect of the "creeping barrage", a tactic that was used for the rest of the war. On 1 July 1916, Horne's XV Corps participated in the costliest battle of the First World War. His force consisted of the 7th and 21st Divisions. They attacked the villages of Fricourt and Mametz, capturing both on the first day although suffering 7,500 casualties in the process.

The divisions bypassed Mametz Wood, a position the Germans had heavily entrenched and needed to be captured to allow XV to carry on the advance. As the 7th Division had suffered heavy casualties, the 38th (Welsh) Division was assigned to the Corps and ordered to take the wood. Horne interfered in the division's efforts to attack the wood, issuing conflicting orders and going as far as to ordering a single platoon into action. Due to the miscommunication between Horne and the division's commander, Ivor Philipps was fired and replaced by the commander of the 7th Division. Horne wrote a "self-serving" account of this event that did no justice to men of the division or the difficulties they had faced. On 9 July the Welsh launched a full-scale attack on the woods and cleared it by the following day. During their 6 days on the Somme, the Welsh division suffered 3,993 casualties. Historian Don Farr wrote that the reputation of the Welsh division suffered due to the repeated interference by Horne in matters best left to the divisional or brigade staff and his "inexperience of battlefield command at this level". With the wood cleared, Horne would lead his Corps during the Bazentin Ridge, the Battle of Delville Wood, and the Battle of Flers–Courcelette.

In September 1916, Horne was created a Knight Commander of the Order of the Bath. After the successful capture of Flers, he was promoted to temporary General and succeeded Sir Charles Monro (after a brief hiatus between 7 August and 29 September when the command was held by Haig's first choice Richard Haking, who was then blocked from receiving the promotion) as commander of the First Army. On 1 January 1917, he was promoted to the substantive rank of lieutenant-general "for distinguished service in the field". His first trial occurred in April 1917, when his troops were sent on a diversionary attack on the fearsome Vimy Ridge, which rose hundreds of feet over the surrounding landscape. French Army commander Robert Nivelle was critical of Horne's plan; Nivelle was the one found incompetent and, after one month of relative failure (and the beginnings of the 1917 French Army mutinies), Nivelle was sacked and replaced with Philippe Pétain.

The attack on Vimy Ridge was spearheaded by the First Army's "shock troops" (the Canadian Corps). The ensuing Battle of Vimy Ridge, the first of a series of actions known as the Battle of Arras was successful: supported by Horne's 1,000-odd artillery pieces, the Canadian forces took the ridge in four days, with approximately 10,000 casualties (against 20,000 German casualties). The capture of Vimy Ridge would prove essential to the British Army: it served as the backbone of the British defence from March 1918 onwards.

Nivelle's failure and sacking lengthened the actions around Arras. With success imminent, Haig began siphoning troops northward, where many would participate in the Battles of Messines and Passchendaele. The First Army served mainly as a diversion and a placeholder until April 1918.

In April, the Germans embarked on the Spring Offensive which was similar to the Allied Somme Offensive two years previously. At first, the attack was successful. On Horne's front, nine German divisions attacked his weak left flank which was manned by two exhausted Portuguese divisions. The Germans advanced six miles to the banks of the River Lawe, where they were repulsed by the 55th (West Lancashire) and the 51st (Highland) Divisions.

After this final German offensive, the British took the initiative permanently. Haig's forces embarked on the Hundred Days Offensive, which ended the war; Horne's troops distinguished themselves in the lengthy offensive.

Post-war
At the end of the war, Horne was created a Knight Commander of the Order of St Michael and St George and a Knight Grand Cross of the Order of the Bath. For his wartime services he received the thanks of Parliament and was raised to the peerage as Baron Horne, of Stirkoke in the County of Caithness. He was promoted to head of the Eastern Command in 1919 and retired from the army in 1923. On 30 July 1920, Horne was appointed a deputy lieutenant of Caithness. He was appointed Master Gunner of St. James's Park, an honorary position he would hold until his death; he was also appointed Colonel of the Highland Light Infantry. He was the Deputy Governor of the Church Lads' Brigade from November 1923 to February 1925, he then became Governor and Commandant until he passed away.

Personal life
Lord Horne married Kate, daughter of George McCorquodale, in 1897. While shooting in his Stirkoke estate in August 1929, he suddenly died of unknown causes, at the age of 68. He was buried on his family plot at Wick. Although by a special remainder his title could be inherited by a male grandchild, his only child, daughter Kate (also known as 'Kitten'), also only had daughters so the title became extinct.

Legacy
It was believed that he had not kept a diary and that his wife had destroyed all his letters after his death, although, in reality, his papers had been handed down to his granddaughters, who had kept them safe. The donation of his extensive papers, which include his diaries and letters, to the Imperial War Museum by the family has allowed his career to be re-evaluated.

References

Further reading

Farr, Don, The Silent General: Horne of the First Army, A Biography of Haig’s Trusted Great War Comrade-in-Arms (Helion, Solihull, 2007)
Robbins, Dr Simon, The First World War Letters of General Lord Horne (The History Press Ltd for the Army Records Society, 28 September 2009)
Robbins, Dr Simon, British Generalship during the Great War: The Military Career of Sir Henry Horne (1861–1929) (Ashgate, 1 September 2010)

External links

Caithness's Greatest General (caithness.org)
Who's Who – Sir Henry Horne (firstworldwar.com)
The Highland Light Infantry (regiments.org)

|-

|-

|-

|-

|-

1861 births
1929 deaths
Scottish military personnel
People from Wick, Caithness
People educated at Harrow School
Graduates of the Royal Military Academy, Woolwich
Royal Artillery officers
British Army personnel of the Second Boer War
British Army generals of World War I
Scottish generals
Barons in the Peerage of the United Kingdom
Knights Commander of the Order of St Michael and St George
Knights Grand Cross of the Order of the Bath
Deputy Lieutenants of Caithness
Barons created by George V
British Army generals
Burials in Scotland